The 128th New York State Legislature, consisting of the New York State Senate and the New York State Assembly, met from January 4 to July 20, 1905, during the first year of Frank W. Higgins's governorship, in Albany.

Background
Under the provisions of the New York Constitution of 1894, 50 Senators and 150 assemblymen were elected in single-seat districts; senators for a two-year term, assemblymen for a one-year term. The senatorial districts were made up of entire counties, except New York County (twelve districts), Kings County (seven districts), Erie County (three districts) and Monroe County (two districts). The Assembly districts were made up of contiguous area, all within the same county, .

At this time there were two major political parties: the Republican Party and the Democratic Party. The Social Democratic Party, the Prohibition Party, the Socialist Labor Party and the People's Party also nominated tickets.

Elections
The New York state election, 1904, was held on November 8. Lt. Gov. Frank W. Higgins was elected Governor; and Matthew Linn Bruce was elected Lieutenant Governor; both Republicans. Of the other seven statewide elective office up for election, six were carried by the Republicans, and one by a Democrat. The approximate party strength at this election, as expressed by the vote for Governor, was: Republicans 813,000; Democrats 732,000; Social Democrats 36,000; Prohibition 21,000; Socialist Labor 9,000; and People's Party 6,000.

Sessions
The Legislature met for the regular session at the State Capitol in Albany on January 4, 1905; and adjourned on May 5.

S. Frederick Nixon (R) was re-elected Speaker.

John Raines (R) was re-elected President pro tempore of the State Senate.

On January 17, the Legislature re-elected Chauncey M. Depew (R) as U.S. Senator from New York for a second six-year term, beginning on March 4, 1905.

Clerk of the Senate James S. Whipple was appointed Forest, Fish and Game Commissioner, and resigned on May 20. Assistant Clerk Lafayette B. Gleason was appointed by Lieutenant Governor M. Linn Bruce as Acting Clerk.

The Legislature met for a special session at the State Capitol in Albany to consider the removal from office of New York Supreme Court Justice Warren B. Hooker. Hooker was acquitted by the Legislature, remained on the bench and the Legislature adjourned July 20, 1905.

On June 21, Gleason was elected Clerk of the Senate for the special session, and the session of 1906.

State Senate

Districts

Note: In 1897, New York County (the boroughs of Manhattan and Bronx), Kings County (the borough of Brooklyn), Richmond County (the borough of Staten Island) and the Western part of Queens County (the borough of Queens) were consolidated into the present-day City of New York. The Eastern part of Queens County (the non-consolidated part) was separated in 1899 as Nassau County. Parts of the 1st and 2nd Assembly districts of Westchester County were annexed by New York City in 1895, and became part of the Borough of the Bronx in 1898.

Members
The asterisk (*) denotes members of the previous Legislature who continued in office as members of this Legislature. James J. Kehoe changed from the Assembly to the Senate.

Employees
 Clerk: James S. Whipple, resigned on May 20
Lafayette B. Gleason, elected on June 21
 Sergeant-at-Arms: 
 Assistant Sergeant-at-Arms: Everett Brown
 Doorkeeper: 
 Assistant Doorkeeper: 
 Stenographer:

State Assembly

Assemblymen

Employees
 Clerk: Archie E. Baxter
 Assistant Clerk: Ray B. Smith
 Sergeant-at-Arms: 
 Doorkeeper: 
 First Assistant Doorkeeper: 
 Second Assistant Doorkeeper: 
 Stenographer:

Notes

Sources
 Official New York from Cleveland to Hughes by Charles Elliott Fitch (Hurd Publishing Co., New York and Buffalo, 1911, Vol. IV; see pg. 350f for assemblymen; and 365f for senators)
 THE NEXT LEGISLATURE in NYT on November 9, 1904
 Journal of the Senate (128th Session) (special session; 1905)
 LEGISLATURE OPENS TODAY in NYT on January 4, 1905

128
1905 in New York (state)
1905 U.S. legislative sessions